Secaș is a commune in Timiș County, Romania. It is composed of four villages: Checheș, Crivobara, Secaș (commune seat) and Vizma.

History 
Secaș first appears in written history in 1440. At that time it was assigned to Arad County, was called Kyszekas ("Little Secaș") and belonged to the Șoimoș Fortress. It continued to exist during the Ottoman period, as Marsigli's writings from 1690–1700 mention it as inhabited. After the conquest of Banat by the Austrians in 1717, the first census took place, in which two localities were recorded: Georg in Sekasch with seven houses and Dollnischas with 14 houses, both in the Lipova District. It is not mentioned on the map from 1761, but the very old Orthodox parish has registers since 1779. Later, only one village, Secaș, inhabited by Romanians, is recorded. The new Orthodox church was built in 1869.

In the interwar period it was part of Plasa Lipova, Timiș-Torontal County and exceeded 1,000 inhabitants. After World War II it began to become depopulated, mainly due to its relative isolation from industrial centers and major communications routes.

Demographics 

Secaș had a population of 299 inhabitants at the 2011 census, down 2% from the 2002 census. Most inhabitants are Romanians (91.64%). For 8.36% of the population, ethnicity is unknown. By religion, most inhabitants are Orthodox (87.96%), but there are also minorities of Baptists (1.67%) and Pentecostals (1.34%). For 8.36% of the population, religious affiliation is unknown.

References 

Communes in Timiș County
Localities in Romanian Banat